Salt Island is one of the islands of the archipelago of the British Virgin Islands located about 4.7 miles south east (151 degrees true) of Road Town, the main town on Tortola. It is named after its salt ponds, which were once an important resource.

Salt Island is most notable for the wreck of the Royal Mail packet steamer, RMS Rhone which sank in a hurricane on 29 October 1867 after she was driven back on Salt Island while attempting to head to safety at sea.  Most of the ship's crew were lost.  Many of the bodies were buried in a mass grave on Salt Island which is a short walk from the main beach and can be easily seen today.  A wide circle of stones is laid upon the grave.

The wreck of the Rhone is one of the best scuba diving sites in the Caribbean.  Some of the underwater scenes in film The Deep were filmed in and around the wreck.

The population of the island hasn't been more than three people since at least 1980. They pay an annual rent to the Queen of the United Kingdom, delivered to the Governor, of a one-pound bag of salt.

The island is often visited by yachts and gets an occasional smaller cruise ship. Where before there were twenty or more households there are now only three or four derelict houses.

Tributes of Salt
The harvesting of salt was once an annual tradition on Salt Island  going back to the days of Queen Victoria in 1867 when the residents would gather once a year to harvest the salt from the lake on Salt Island. It became customary for the Administrator of the Virgin Islands and later the Governor of the Virgin Islands to send one pound of salt to the Monarch on the Queen's birthday. The tradition subsequently fell away. However, in 2015, Governor John Duncan decided to renew the tradition. For the first time in many years, a pound of salt from Salt Island was presented to the Sovereign. The Governor took the salt to London and presented it to the Sovereign in March 2015. The salt had been harvested specially for the occasion by Calvin "Jandy" Smith of East End, Tortola. At their meeting the Governor gave Her Majesty a pouch of salt from Salt Island as a gift from the people of the Virgin Islands. At the annual parade celebrating the Sovereign's official birthday on 13 June 2015, the Governor announced that the previous tradition of presenting a pound of salt to the Sovereign would be renewed as a tradition in future years.

See also
 List of lighthouses in the British Virgin Islands

References

External links

 Salt Island at BVI Bound

Islands of the British Virgin Islands
Lighthouses in the British Virgin Islands